Royal York Road, historically known as Church Street or New Church Street, is a north-south arterial road in Toronto, Ontario, Canada.  It is a concession road, 5 concessions (10 km) west of Yonge Street, and runs through many residential neighbourhoods, most notably Mimico and the Kingsway. It is classified as a "minor arterial" road by the city of Toronto.

The road begins in the south near the shoreline of Lake Ontario, just south of Lake Shore Blvd. It then travels through the neighbourhoods of Mimico, the Queensway, Sunnylea, the Kingsway, and Humber Valley Village.  It also serves as the boundary for two neighbourhoods north of Eglinton Avenue; Richview, and Humber Heights.  The road crosses three creeks; Mimico Creek, and two tributaries of the Humber River; Humber Creek, and Silver Creek.

Royal York Road officially ends at Dixon Road, but its alignment continues further north as St. Phillips Road, which ends at Weston Road. Weston Road north of St. Phillips continues north on the same general alignment as Royal York, eventually leading into Vaughan.

History

Royal York Road started out as a local street in Mimico called Church Street when the village was settled in the late 19th century. During this time, it was a dirt road north of there. This changed in the 1920s when The Kingsway was developed, and in the 1930s with the development of Humber Valley Village. At this point, the paved section extended up to Eglinton Avenue. The entire road would finally be paved by the 1950s when the remaining areas were developed.

Royal York Road has recently undergone several reconstruction projects. The  1.25 metre wide bike lanes that were approved and painted during this process on the stretch between Mimico Creek and Usher Avenue have been criticized for being too narrow, and a violation of Transportation Association of Canada standards (which the city of Toronto follows), for not conforming to the 1.5 metre minimum.

Public transit
The Toronto Transit Commission provides bus services along Royal York Road. Royal York subway station on the Bloor-Danforth line is the major transit terminal that these services feed into. North of Bloor, the main route is 73 Royal York, which also goes along Albion Road in the Rexdale area, and south of Bloor, the primary route is 76 Royal York South, which mainly carries commuters from Mimico. There are two additional routes that serve parts of Royal York because they use it to feed into the subway. These routes are; 48 Rathburn (which uses Royal York from Bloor to Anglesey), and 15 Evans (Bloor to Evans).

The Mimico GO Station on the Lakeshore West line provides commuter rail service to downtown, and other areas in the Greater Toronto Area, such as Hamilton, and Oakville.

Landmarks
Local landmarks along Royal York Road (north to south):
 Sanctuary Park Cemetery
 Riverside Cemetery
 Royal York Plaza
 All Saints Catholic elementary school
 Scarlett Heights Entrepreneurial Academy
 Lambton Mills Cemetery
 Humbertown Shopping Centre
 Royal York subway station
 École Sainte-Marguerite d'Youville Catholic elementary school
 Bishop Allen Academy
 Etobicoke School of the Arts
 Mimico GO Station

See also
Major streets in Toronto which intersect with Royal York (north to south):
Dixon Road
Lawrence Avenue
Eglinton Avenue
Dundas Street West
Bloor Street
The Queensway
Lake Shore Boulevard

References

Roads in Toronto